Vittoria Bentivoglio was a singer in the 16th century Ferrarese court of Alfonso II d'Este and a member of the first period of the court's concerto delle donne. She was born into the noble Cybò family, and later married a member of the renowned Bentivoglio family. She remained a prominent member of the court even after she stopped singing regularly for the musica secreta. She also danced in the balletto delle donne.

Musicians from Ferrara
16th-century Italian singers
16th-century Italian women singers